Sarah Wayne Callies (born June 1, 1977) is an American actress. She is known for starring as Sara Tancredi in Fox's Prison Break and as Lori Grimes in AMC's The Walking Dead. She has also starred as Katie Bowman in USA Network's Colony and Robin Perry in NBC's Council of Dads and has had film roles in Whisper (2007), Black Gold (2011), and The Show (2017).

Early life and education
Callies was born in La Grange, Illinois, the daughter of Valerie Wayne and David E. Callies, respectively English and Law professors at the University of Hawaii, Manoa. 

At age one, Callies moved to Honolulu, Hawaii with her family. Throughout her youth, she expressed an interest in acting through participating in various school plays at the independent Punahou School. After graduating from high school, Callies entered Dartmouth College where she obtained a Bachelor of Arts degree in drama in 1999, with a minor in women's studies and a senior fellowship in Indigenous theology. In conjunction with her studies, Callies remained involved in theatre. She continued her education at the National Theatre Conservatory, where she obtained a Master of Fine Arts degree in 2002.

Career
Callies moved to New York in 2003 and then quickly landed her first television role as Kate O'Malley, a recurring part on the short-lived CBS show Queens Supreme. Her first starring role was as Detective Jane Porter on The WB's Tarzan.

Prison Break
After making various guest appearances on Law & Order: Special Victims Unit, Dragnet (2003), and NUMB3RS, Callies gained a starring role on Fox's Prison Break as Sara Tancredi. She played the role in the first two seasons, but her character was killed off for the third season before being brought back for the fourth season. According to Prison Breaks executive producer Matt Olmstead, although the writers, the network, Callies herself, and he all wanted her to stay on the show, the character was written out due to contract disputes. She stated through a spokesperson to TV Guide in fall 2007:

However, in March 2008, Olmstead stated that the character of Sara is still alive and would return in season four. Though the character Sara Tancredi appeared to have a violent death, Olmstead stated "...we realized that there was actually a way she could still be alive." Executive Producer Matt Olmstead admitted the fans' overwhelming response to her death had influenced the decision to bring the character, and Callies, back to the show.

The Walking Dead
In 2010, Callies was cast in the major role of Lori Grimes on the AMC horror/drama series The Walking Dead, based on the comic-book series of the same name. The drama became the highest-rated show in that cable channel's history. Callies played the role from the show's start until season three.

Other projects
Callies starred in her first feature, the independent film The Celestine Prophecy in 2006. She also starred in Whisper the following year. In April 2010, she appeared on the Fox Television drama House as a patient of the week, whose open marriage fascinates House and the team. In August 2010, Callies' first screenplay, an adaptation of Campbell Geeslin's children's book Elena's Serenade, was optioned by French production company Fulldawa Films. 

Callies starred in the Nigerian movie Black Gold (2011) and one of the female lead roles in the Canadian thriller Faces in the Crowd (2011). In 2015, she co-starred with Nicolas Cage in Uli Edel's thriller film Pay the Ghost. In 2016, she returned to television in the lead role of Katie Bowman in Colony.

Personal life
On July 21, 2002, Callies married Josh Winterhalt, whom she met at Dartmouth. On January 23, 2007, her publicist announced that the couple were expecting their first child. Their daughter was born in 2007. Their second child, an adopted son, was born in 2013.

Filmography

Film

Television

Awards and nominations

References

External links

 
 
 Sarah Wayne Callies talks to theTVaddict.com

1977 births
21st-century American actresses
Actresses from Hawaii
Actresses from Honolulu
American film actresses
American stage actresses
American television actresses
Dartmouth College alumni
Living people
People from La Grange, Illinois
Punahou School alumni